Pine Gap is an Australian television series that was released on Netflix and broadcast on ABC in 2018. The six-part series is written and created by Greg Haddrick and Felicity Packard with Mat King directing all six episodes. The series is produced by Screentime.

Overview
Pine Gap is an international political thriller which is set around the Australian and American joint defence intelligence facility at Pine Gap, south-west of the town of Alice Springs, Australia.

Cast
 Parker Sawyers as Gus Thomson, an American mission director
 Tess Haubrich as Jasmina Delic, a Serbian Australian communications intelligence team leader
 Jacqueline McKenzie as Kath Sinclair, the Australian deputy chief of the facility
 Steve Toussaint as Ethan James, the American chief of the facility
 Stephen Curry as Jacob Kitto, an Australian mission director seconded from the Australian Secret Intelligence Service
 Sachin Joab as Simon Penny, an Australian communications intelligence analyst 
 Mark Leonard Winter as Moses Dreyfus, an American foreign instrumentation signals intelligence analyst and a loner
 Kelton Pell as Dr Paul Dupain, an Elder of the Arrernte people and medical doctor
 Madeleine Madden as Immy Dupain, an activist Arrernte law student and Paul's daughter
 Lewis Fitz-Gerald as Rudi Fox, the American chief of intelligence operations
 Edwina Wren as Eloise Chambers, an American imagery intelligence analyst 
 Alice Keohavong as Deborah Vora, a Laotian Australian electronic intelligence analyst in a lesbian relationship
 Jason Chong as Zhou Lin, an executive for the Chinese state-owned mining company Shonguran
 Simone Kessell as Belle James, American wife of Ethan 
 Milly Alcock as Marissa, an Alice Springs local
 Michael-Anthony Taylor as Will Thompson, Gus's father

Episodes

Season 1 (2018)

Reception

Critical response 
Luke Buckmaster of The Guardian gave Pine Gap a critical review, writing that the series was "less a spy drama than an attempt to cure insomnia." He also criticised the series for what he regarded as its poor story-writing and unsatisfactory acting, giving it one out of five stars. Helen Razer of the Daily Review also gave the TV series a negative review, disparaging it as "a poor attempt at promoting favourable propaganda about Australia–United States relations". Razer also criticized what she regarded as the tokenistic use of Aboriginal characters.

Pat LaMarco of The Daily Free Press described the series as a "dull and sluggish attempt at a thriller". He also viewed the show's release on Netflix as a sign of what he regarded as the deteriorating quality of the streaming company's content. By contrast, Genevieve Burgess of Pajiba gave Pine Gap a favourable review, describing it as a "spy thriller for people who don't like spy thrillers." She praised the series for its realistic low-stakes political thriller plot and for defying conventional Hollywood spying tropes by exploring the everyday challenges of its main cast members.

Nine-Dash Line controversy 
Pine Gap was removed from Netflix in Vietnam, following an order from the country's Authority of Broadcasting and Electronic Information, as a map with the nine-dash line was shown in two episodes of the series, albeit in a context in which characters criticised China's claim over the waters in on-screen dialogue. In November 2021, the Movie and Television Review and Classification Board of the Philippines ordered Netflix to remove certain episodes that featured the nine-dash line, deeming it "unfit for public exhibition" after the country's foreign department issued a complaint calling the line "illegal" and a "violation of Philippine sovereignty".

References

External links

English-language Netflix original programming
Australian Broadcasting Corporation original programming
2018 Australian television series debuts
Television shows set in the Northern Territory
Spy thriller television series
Television series by Screentime